The Debrecen amusement park railway is a short  narrow gauge railway located in Debrecen, Hungary. Their fleet consists of a single C50 diesel locomotive GV-4505.

Narrow gauge railways in Hungary